Ramazan Irbaykhanovich Gadzhimuradov (born 9 January 1998) is a Russian football player of Kumyk origin who plays for FC Dynamo Makhachkala on loan from FC Ural Yekaterinburg. He mostly plays as a right winger, with some appearances as a left winger.

Club career
He made his debut in the Russian Professional Football League for FC Veles Moscow on 19 July 2017 in a game against FC Spartak Kostroma.

He made his Russian Football National League debut for FC SKA-Khabarovsk on 7 July 2019 in a game against FC Shinnik Yaroslavl.

On 15 January 2021, he signed with Russian Premier League club FC Ural Yekaterinburg. He made his RPL debut for Ural on 28 February 2021 in a game against FC Krasnodar. 

On 20 February 2023, Gadzhimuradov joined FC Dynamo Makhachkala on loan until the end of the season.

Career statistics

References

External links
 
 
 Profile by Russian Professional Football League

1998 births
People from Khasavyurt
Sportspeople from Dagestan
Living people
Russian footballers
Association football midfielders
FC Veles Moscow players
FC SKA-Khabarovsk players
FC Ural Yekaterinburg players
FC Dynamo Makhachkala players
Russian Premier League players
Russian First League players
Russian Second League players